Bengou is a village and rural commune in Niger. The elevation in Bengou is 571 ft (174m).  A 2012 census reports the Bengou population at 13,452.

References

Communes of Niger